The Bornean crestless fireback (Lophura pyronota) is a member of the Phasianidae. It was previously known as the crestless fireback when the two species were lumped together. The Bornean crestless fireback is found in northern Borneo.

References

Gallopheasants
Birds described in 1841
Taxa named by George Robert Gray